Ragin' Cajun is a steel mouse roller coaster at Six Flags America in Upper Marlboro, Maryland. Manufactured by Zamperla and Reverchon Industries, the design is a "Crazy Mouse", which is similar to a "Wild Mouse." Crazy Mouse coasters' cars freely spin during the second half of the ride, but Wild Mouse coasters' cars do not. The ride runs five cars at a time, and each car holds up to four riders with a maximum of three adults. Ragin' Cajun previously operated at Six Flags Great America from 2004 to 2013.

History
On January 17, 2004, Six Flags Great America announced five new attractions and a whole new themed section called Mardi Gras, which included Ragin' Cajun. The newly themed section Mardi Gras transformed parts of the Orleans Place section. The newly family themed area opened on May 3, 2004 along with the park for the 2004 season. Ragin' Cajun opened later that month for the public on May 28, 2004.

On May 29, 2004, the day after opening of the new roller coaster, a 52-year-old Six Flags ride mechanic Jack Brouse of Zion, Illinois, was hit by one of Ragin' Cajun's car full of passengers as he was working along the tracks of the roller coaster. Suffering from a traumatic head injury, he died at Froedtert Hospital in Milwaukee.

On August 29, 2013, Six Flags America announced that they would be adding a new Mardi Gras themed area for the 2014 season for their park. The area would include a roller coaster named, Ragin' Cajun and a Flying Scooters attraction called French Quarter Flyers. With no official announcement from Six Flags or Six Flags Great America, the Illinois Ragin' Cajun was removed after the 2013 season. 

The new Mardi Gras section at Six Flags America which includes Ragin' Cajun, replaced the former Southwest Territory themed area. The rides in Southwest Territory including Wild One was rethemed to fit the new Mardi Gras theme.

Ragin Cajun at Six Flags America was built on the former location of Two Face: The Flip Side that was removed from the park in 2007.

Mardi Gras opened with Six Flags America on opening day of the 2014 season. All rides excluding Ragin' Cajun opened on April 5, 2014.

Six Flags America officially opened Ragin' Cajun on June 21, 2014.

References 

Roller coasters in Illinois
Roller coasters introduced in 2004
Roller coasters introduced in 2014
Roller coasters operated by Six Flags
Six Flags America
Six Flags Great America
Amusement rides that closed in 2013
2004 establishments in Illinois
2013 disestablishments in Illinois
2014 establishments in Maryland
Roller coasters in Maryland